The Stryama (known in Antiquity as Syrmus) is a river in southern Bulgaria, an important left tributary of the Maritsa.  The river is 98.7 km long and has a drainage basin of 1,490 km2.

The Stryama has its source in the Balkan Mountains under Vezhen Peak, named Kameniditsa in this section, turning east at Stryama Station to pass close to Klisura and turn southeast at Rozino entering the Karlovo Plain.  It then makes a turn south at Banya, forming the Stremski prolom (Stryama Gorge) between the mountains Sashtinska and Sarnena Sredna Gora, where the Dalga Vada separates from it to later flow into the Maritsa as a separate river.  Afterwards the Stryama passes a number of villages to empty into the Maritsa 15 km east of Plovdiv.

References

Rivers of Bulgaria
Landforms of Plovdiv Province